Saint-Alphonse  may refer to:
 Saint-Alphonse, Gaspésie, Quebec
 Saint-Alphonse, Montérégie, Quebec
 Saint Alphonse, Manitoba

See also
 Alphonse (disambiguation)